Michel Heller (Михаил Яковлевич Геллер, 1922–1997) was a Russian historian.
Mikhail Y. Geller (August 31, 1922, Mogilev, Belorussian SSR, January 3, 1997, Paris, France) - historian, journalist, writer, critic and dissident. Author of several books that explore different aspects of Russian history and literature of the Soviet period, published in England, France, Poland, Hungary and other countries. He has proved an authority in the field of modern Russian literature, the modern history of Russia. His works are better known outside Russia. Author of a monograph on homo sovieticus, social engineering and propaganda in the USSR titled "Cogs in the Wheel: The Formation of Soviet Man".

References

1922 births
1997 deaths
Gulag detainees
Historians of Russia
People from Mogilev
20th-century Russian historians
Soviet literary historians
Soviet male writers
20th-century Russian male writers
People associated with the magazine "Kultura"